Luiz Francisco (born July 24, 2000) is a Brazilian skateboarder. He has competed in men's park events at several World Skate Championships, finishing ninth in 2018 and taking silver in 2019. At the 2019 X Games, he was seventh.

At the 2020 Summer Olympics in Tokyo, Japan, he ranked first in the semifinals and fourth in the final of the men's park skateboarding event. The event took place at the Ariake Urban Sports Park on August 5, 2021.

References 

Brazilian skateboarders
Skateboarders at the 2020 Summer Olympics
2000 births
Living people
Olympic skateboarders of Brazil
X Games athletes
Sportspeople from São Paulo
World Skateboarding Championship medalists
People from Lorena, São Paulo